Kleče pri Dolu is a village east of Dol pri Ljubljani in the eastern Upper Carniola region of Slovenia.

Name
The name of the settlement was changed from Kleče to Kleče pri Dolu in 1955. In the past the German name was Kletsche.

References

External links

Kleče pri Dolu on Geopedia

Populated places in the Municipality of Dol pri Ljubljani